Torfinn is a Norwegian male given name.

Origin
The name Torfinn is derived from Old Norse Þórfinnr, which is composed of Þór (meaning thunder, also the name of the Nordic god of thunder Thor) and finnr, which refers to Finnish people. Thus it has been hypothesised to mean thunder of/to the Finns.

Notable people
Notable people with this name include:
 Torfinn Bentzen (1912–1986), Norwegian jurist
 Torfinn Bjarkøy (born 1952), Norwegian civil servant
 Torfinn Bjørnaas (1914-2009), Norwegian resistance member
 Torfinn Haukås (1931-1993), Norwegian novelist
 Torfinn Opheim (born 1961), Norwegian politician
 Torfinn Skard (1891-1970), Norwegian horticulturist

See also
 Thorfinn (disambiguation)
 Torfin, Minnesota, United States

References

Norwegian masculine given names